Two Black Sheep is a 1933 novel by the British writer Warwick Deeping. Like another novel Exiles that Deeping wrote three years earlier, it is set in contemporary Italy and shows some admiration for the Fascist regime of Benito Mussolini.

In 1935 it was adapted into an American film Two Sinners.

References

Bibliography
 Mary Grover. The Ordeal of Warwick Deeping: Middlebrow Authorship and Cultural Embarrassment. Associated University Presse, 2009.

External links
 

1933 British novels
Novels by Warwick Deeping
British novels adapted into films
Novels set in Italy
Cassell (publisher) books